Engelen is a Dutch patronymic surname, meaning "son of Engel", though occasionally the name may refer to the town Engelen. People with this surname include:

Jos Engelen (born 1950), Dutch physicist
Lucien Engelen (born 1962), Dutch healthcare researcher
Marijke Engelen (born 1961), Dutch synchronized swimmer
Maurice Engelen (born 1959), Belgian DJ and techno musician known as "Praga Khan"
Paul Engelen (born 1949), British make-up artist
Simone Engelen (born 1971), Dutch television host
Ursula Engelen-Kefer (born 1943), German trade unionist

See also
Van Engelen
Engels (surname)

References

Dutch-language surnames
Patronymic surnames